KNBN (channel 21) is a television station in Rapid City, South Dakota, United States, affiliated with NBC and MyNetworkTV. Owned by Jim Simpson's Rapid Broadcasting, the station maintains studios on South Plaza Drive in Rapid City, and its transmitter is located on Cowboy Hill west of downtown.

KNBN can also be seen on low-power digital translators KWBH-LD (channel 27) in Rapid City; K22AD-D (channel 22) in Gillette, Wyoming; and K35MW-D (channel 35) in Lead, South Dakota (also serving the Black Hills region).

History

In March 1996, KEVN-TV's owner, Blackstar, announced plans to affiliate the longtime NBC outlet for the Rapid City area with the Fox network; Fox held an equity stake in Blackstar. This presented the possibility that Rapid City would be left without an NBC affiliate. Locally based Rapid Broadcasting, whose president Gilbert Moyle had been a part-owner of KEVN from 1973 to 1985, bought low-power TV station K24AM, a primarily Christian outlet which had broadcast since the mid-1980s, and increased its transmitter power. It also obtained the NBC affiliation for Rapid City for the low-power outlet, all with a month to go. KNBN-LP (channel 24, later KKRA-LP) officially launched July 15, the date that KEVN switched to Fox, and immediately appeared on local cable systems (including channel 10 in Rapid City).

KNBN launched without a local news presence. In December 1996, it began producing news cut-ins during Today. A full news service debuted September 22, 1997, as NewsCenter1, airing at 6 and 10 p.m. nightly; the early evening time slot contrasted with KOTA and KEVN, who presented their main news at 5:30. By the time that newscast had debuted, KNBN-LP—call sign and programming—had moved from the channel 24 station to channel 27 in Rapid City with a translator on channel 31 in Lead; the next year, KKRA became an affiliate of Pax TV. The channel 27 and 31 construction permits had been held by the Plaza Boulevard Wesleyan Church.

Rapid Broadcasting had been one of 11 applicants seeking to obtain a full-power license on channel 21. The passage of the Telecommunications Act of 1996 and Balanced Budget Act of 1997 forced the Federal Communications Commission (FCC) to scrap the comparative hearing process and led to the auction of the assignment in September 1999. Rapid made the winning bid, holding off four other hopefuls, notably including Sunbelt Communications Company. KNBN began broadcasting at full power on channel 21 on May 14, 2000.

News operation
KNBN presently broadcasts 16 hours of locally produced newscasts each week (with three hours each weekday and a half-hour each on Saturdays and Sundays).

Technical information

Subchannels
The station's digital signal is multiplexed:

Translators

Analog-to-digital conversion
KNBN shut down its analog signal, over UHF channel 21, on February 1, 2009, and "flash-cut" its digital signal into operation on channel 21. The "flash-cut" was necessary as the station had its original construction permit granted after the FCC finalized the DTV allotment plan on April 27, 1997; as a result, the station did not have a companion channel for a digital signal.

See also
Channel 1 branded TV stations in the United States
Channel 21 digital TV stations in the United States
Channel 21 virtual TV stations in the United States

References

External links

NBC network affiliates
MyNetworkTV affiliates
Television channels and stations established in 2000
2000 establishments in South Dakota
NBN